The following buildings are of significance in pioneering the use of solar powered building design:

 MIT Solar House #1, Massachusetts, United States (Hoyt C. Hottel & others, 1939)
 Howard Sloan House, Glenview, Illinois, United States (George Fred Keck, 1940)
 "Solar Hemicycle", near Madison, Wisconsin, United States (Frank Lloyd Wright, 1944)
 Löf House, Boulder, Colorado, United States (George Löf, 1945)
 Rosenberg House, Tucson, Arizona, United States (Arthur T. Brown, 1946)
 MIT Solar House #2, United States, (Hoyt C. Hottel & others, 1947)
 Peabody House ("Dover Sun House", MIT Solar House #6), Dover, Massachusetts, United States (Eleanor Raymond & Mária Telkes, 1948)
 Henry P. Glass House, Northfield, Illinois, United States (Henry P. Glass, 1948)
 Rose Elementary School, Tucson, Arizona, United States (Arthur T. Brown, 1948)
 MIT Solar House #3, United States, (Hoyt C. Hottel & others, 1949)
 New Mexico State College House, New Mexico, United States (Lawrence Gardenhire, 1953)
 Lefever Solar House, Pennsylvania, United States (HR Lefever, 1954)
 Bliss House, Amado, Arizona, United States (Raymond W. Bliss & M. K. Donavan, 1954)
 Solar Building, Albuquerque, New Mexico, United States (Frank Bridgers & Don Paxton, 1956)
 University of Toronto House, Toronto, Ontario, Canada (EA Allcut, 1956)
 Solar House, Tokyo, Japan (Masanosuke Yanagimachi, 1956)
 Solar House, Bristol, United Kingdom (L Gardner, 1956)
 Curtis House, Rickmansworth, United Kingdom (Edward JW Curtis, 1956)
 Löf House, Denver, Colorado, United States (James M. Hunter & George Löf, 1957)
 AFASE "Living With the Sun" House, Phoenix, Arizona, United States (Peter Lee, Robert L. Bliss & John Yellott, 1958)
 MIT Solar House #4, United States (Hoyt C. Hottel & others, 1958)
 Solar House, Casablanca, Morocco (CM Shaw & Associates, 1958)
 Solar House, Nagoya, Japan (Masanosuke Yanagimachi, 1958)
 Curtiss-Wright "Sun Court," Princeton, New Jersey, United States (Maria Telkes & Aladar Olgyay, 1958)
 "Sun-Tempered House" Van Dresser Residence (Peter van Dresser, 1958)
 Thomason Solar House "Solaris" #1, Washington D.C., United States (Harry Thomason, 1959)
 Passive Solar House, Odeillo, France (Félix Trombe & Jacques Michel, 1967)
 Steve Baer House, Corrales, New Mexico, United States (Steve Baer, 1971)
 Skytherm House, Atascadero, California, United States (Harold R. Hay, 1973)
 Solar One, Newark, Delaware, United States (K.W. Böer & Maria Telkes, 1973)
 MIT Solar Building V, Cambridge, Massachusetts, United States (T.E. Johnson, C.C. Benton, S. Hale, 1978)
 "Unit One" Balcomb Residence, Santa Fe, New Mexico, United States (William Lumpkins, 1979)
 The first Zero Energy Design home, Oklahoma, United States (Larry Hartweg, 1979)
 Saunders Shrewsbury House, Shrewsbury, Massachusetts, United States (Norman B. Saunders, 1981)
 Multiple IEA SHC "Task 13" houses, Worldwide (IEA SHC, 1989)
 Multiple passive houses in Darmstadt, Germany (Bott, Ridder & Westermeyer, 1990)
 Heliotrope, Freiburg im Breisgau, Germany (Rolf Disch, 1994)
 The Druk White Lotus School, Ladakh, India (Arup, 2002)
 31 Tannery Project, Branchburg, New Jersey, United States (2006)
 Sun Ship, Freiburg im Breisgau, Germany (Rolf Disch, 2006)

See also
Passive solar building design
History of passive solar building design
Low-energy house
Energy-plus-house
Sustainable development

References

Solar design
Low-energy building
Building engineering
Energy conservation
Lists of buildings and structures
Lists related to renewable energy